Calliophis bivirgatus  is a species of snake in the family Elapidae known commonly as the blue coral snake or blue Malayan coral snake. It is native to Southeast Asia.

Geographic range and distribution
This terrestrial snake occurs in Brunei, Indonesia, Malaysia, Singapore, Thailand, and Burma.

There are three subspecies:
C. b. bivirgatus – Indonesia
C. b. flaviceps – Indonesia, Malaysia, Thailand, Singapore, Burma
C. b. tetrataenia – Indonesia, Malaysia, Brunei

Description
This species was assigned to the new world coral snake genus Maticora until phylogenetic studies revealed this species to be nested within the tropical coral snake species clade Calliophis and sister species to Calliophis intestinalis, the banded Malaysian coral snake.

This is a medium-sized coral snake with a slender body. It has a red head, tail and belly. The back is dark blue to black in color, and it usually has a large blue or white stripe on each flank.

The snake, especially when juvenile, is often confused with the pink-headed reed snake (Calamaria schlegeli) as they share similar habitat and appearance. The reed snake is nonvenomous, while the coral snake is potentially lethal. They also are very similar to another venomous snake, the red-headed krait (Bungarus flaviceps).

Biology
This uncommon snake is considered semi-fossorial and is found in the leaf litter of primary and secondary forests. It preys on other snakes. When threatened it usually flees, but it may remain in place with its red tail erect as a defensive message.

Venom
Blue coral snake venom has only occasionally caused human deaths. This species has unusually long venom glands, extending to 25% of the length of the body. Unlike other snakes of the family Elapidae, its venom does not contain a neurotoxin. The toxic element is instead a unique  cytotoxin called calliotoxin that causes near instantaneous paralysis by blocking the victims sodium channels. The venom also contains phosphodiesterases, which promote the release of adenosine, causing in turn hypotension, inflammation, and neurotransmitter blockade in prey items and other bite victims.  This ability is especially important as their prey consists mostly of other venomous snakes.  There is no known antidote, though there is hope that the venom may eventually prove useful in the management of chronic pain in humans.

See also
 Ophiophagy

References

Further reading
 Boie F. 1827. "Bemerkungen über Merrem's Versuchs eines Systems der Amphibien. 1te Lieferung: Ophidier ". Isis von Oken 20: 508-566. (Elaps bivirgatus, p. 556).
 Boulenger GA. 1896. Catalogue of the Snakes in the British Museum (Natural History). Volume III., Containing the Colubridæ (Opisthoglyphæ and Proteroglyphæ), ... London: Trustees of the British Museum (Natural History). (Taylor and FRancis, printers). xiv + 727 pp. + Plates I-XXV. (Doliophis bivirgatus, pp. 400–401).
 Das I. 2006. A Photographic Guide to Snakes and Other Reptiles of Borneo. Sanibel Island, Florida: Ralph Curtis Books. 144 pp. . (Calliophis bivirgata [sic], p. 61).
Oshea, Mark; Halliday, Tim; Metcalf, Jonathan (editor). 2002. Reptiles and Amphibians: Smithsonian Handbooks. London: DK (Dorling Kinderley). 256 pp. .

bivirgatus
Snakes of Asia
Reptiles of Brunei
Reptiles of Cambodia
Reptiles of Indonesia
Reptiles of Malaysia
Reptiles of Singapore
Reptiles of Thailand
Reptiles described in 1827
Taxa named by Friedrich Boie
Reptiles of Borneo